Jorge Alcaraz (born 4 July 1968) is a Paraguayan footballer. He played in 15 matches for the Paraguay national football team from 1995 to 1997. He was also part of Paraguay's squad for the 1997 Copa América tournament.

References

External links
 

1968 births
Living people
Paraguayan footballers
Paraguay international footballers
Place of birth missing (living people)
Association football defenders